Mimoun Ouitot is a Moroccan alpine skier. He competed in the men's giant slalom at the 1968 Winter Olympics.

References

Year of birth missing (living people)
Living people
Moroccan male alpine skiers
Olympic alpine skiers of Morocco
Alpine skiers at the 1968 Winter Olympics
Place of birth missing (living people)
20th-century Moroccan people